Ribeirinha is a parish in the district of Ribeira Grande in the Azores. The population in 2011 was 2,349, in an area of 17.98 km2. It contains the localities Gramas, Lameiro, Ribeirinha, Santa Rosa and Santo António.

References

Parishes of Ribeira Grande, Azores